Boston Harbor is an unincorporated community in Thurston County, Washington. The community is home to the Dofflemyer Point Light, built in 1934 and listed on the National Register of Historic Places in 1995.

History
Seattle real estate developer C. D. Hillman platted the site in 1907 and promoted sale of lots by offering cash prizes to buyers.

Geography
Boston Harbor is located at the intersection of Pickering Passage and Dana Passage, with outlying parts also falling along Budd Inlet. It is located between Dover Point and Dofflemyer Point, which is marked by a distinctive concrete lighthouse that is not accessible by land. Boston Harbor is a formerly rural area that has now become an affluent exurb of Olympia, Washington.

Parks and recreation
The community is home to the Boston Harbor Marina, and sits near Squaxin Park (formerly Priest Point Park) and Burfoot Park.

Education
Children in the area have attended the formerly independent Boston Harbor School since the early 1900s, now part of the Olympia School District.

See also
 Olympia, Washington

References

Unincorporated communities in Thurston County, Washington
Unincorporated communities in Washington (state)